Cedar Creek Reservoir may refer to various reservoirs in the United States:

Cedar Creek Reservoir (Alabama) in Franklin County
Cedar Creek Reservoir (Texas) in Henderson and Kaufman Counties